Colfelice is a comune (municipality) in the Province of Frosinone in the Italian region Lazio, located about  southeast of Rome and about  southeast of Frosinone.

Colfelice borders the following municipalities: Arce, Rocca d'Arce, Roccasecca, San Giovanni Incarico.

References

External links
 Official website

Cities and towns in Lazio